Hüüru is a village in Saue Parish, Harju County in northern Estonia. Hüüru has a population of 417 (as of 1 January 2012).

Hüüru was first mentioned in the Danish Census Book in 1241 as Hiurenkylae. In 1560 the Hüüru Manor (Hüer) was established on the site of the Harku Manor's watermill. The watermill had existed already in 1540–50. The main building of the manor was built in partially in the 18th and 19th centuries. Nowadays it is used as a local library. The watermill, which is situated just by the road houses a popular taverna where the river trout is served as their main article.

Gallery

References

External links
Hüüru village society 
Hüüru Manor at Estonian Manors Portal
Trout grill at Hüüru Mill
Hüüru library

Villages in Harju County
Kreis Harrien